Kotchevnik is a genus of moths in the family Cossidae.

Species
 Kotchevnik baj Yakovlev, 2011 
 Kotchevnik choui (Fang et Chen, 1989)
 Kotchevnik durrelli Yakovlev, 2004
 Kotchevnik modestus (Staudinger, 1887)
 Kotchevnik schablyai Yakovlev, 2004
 Kotchevnik tapinus (Püngeler, 1898)

References

  2004: Two new genera of Carpenter Moths from the Palaearctic (Lepidoptera: Cossidae). Atalanta 35 (3/4): 357–368.

External links

Natural History Museum Lepidoptera generic names catalog

Cossinae